The Lucayan Archipelago (named for the original native Lucayan people), also known as the Bahama Archipelago, is an island group comprising the Commonwealth of The Bahamas and the British Overseas Territory of the Turks and Caicos Islands. The archipelago is in the western North Atlantic Ocean, north of Cuba and the other Antilles, and east and southeast of Florida.

William Keegan writes: "Modern political considerations aside, the islands form a single archipelago with common geological, ecological, and cultural roots." Though part of the West Indies, the Lucayan Archipelago is not located on the Caribbean Sea.

Proposed federation 
In 2010, the leaders of The Bahamas and the Turks and Caicos Islands discussed the possibility of forming a federation.

Countries and territories 
 The Bahamas
 Turks and Caicos Islands (United Kingdom)

The Mouchoir Bank, the Silver Bank, and the Navidad Bank are a submerged continuation of the archipelago, to the southeast of the Turks and Caicos Islands.  Mouchoir Bank is disputed between the Turks and Caicos Islands and Dominican Republic, Silver Bank and Navidad Bank are part of the Dominican Republic.

Etymologies of island names 
Julian Granberry and Gary Vescelius suggest the following Lucayan (Taíno) etymologies for various Lucayan islands.

See also 

 List of islands of the Lucayan Archipelago
 West Indies

Notes

References 
 Keegan, William F. (1992) The People Who Discovered Columbus: The Prehistory of the Bahamas. University Press of Florida

Further reading 
 

Islands of the North Atlantic Ocean
Archipelagoes of the Atlantic Ocean
International archipelagoes
Archipelagoes of the Bahamas
Islands of the Turks and Caicos Islands